Phú Mỹ is a district-level town of Bà Rịa–Vũng Tàu province, Vietnam.

Phú Mỹ may refer to several other places in Vietnam, including:

 , a ward of District 7, Ho Chi Minh City
 Phú Mỹ, Bình Dương, a ward of Thủ Dầu Một
 Phú Mỹ (ward of Phú Mỹ town), a ward of Phú Mỹ town
 Phú Mỹ, An Giang, a township and capital of Phú Tân District, An Giang Province
 , a commune of Giang Thành District
 Phú Mỹ, Bến Tre, a commune of Mỏ Cày Bắc District
 , a commune of Mỹ Tú District
 , a commune of Phù Ninh District, Phú Thọ
 Phú Mỹ, Cà Mau, a commune of Phú Tân District, Cà Mau Province
 , a commune of Phú Vang District
 , a commune of Tân Phước District

See also
 Phù Mỹ District, a rural district of Bình Định Province
 Phù Mỹ, a township and capital of Phù Mỹ District